Grapholita hymenosa is a moth of the family Tortricidae. It is found in Nigeria.

The wingspan is about 12 mm. The ground colour of the forewings is orange yellow, sprinkled and strigulated with greyish brown. The costal strigulae are cream and the subapical strigula is paler. The dorsal patch is slightly paler than remaining the wing, with brownish lines and the tornal area is brown. The hindwings are brown.

Etymology
The species name refers to the sterigma and is derived from Greek hymen (meaning a membrane).

References

Moths described in 2013
Grapholitini